Tommy Rogers may refer to:

 Tommy Rogers (wrestler) (1961–2015), American professional wrestler Thomas Crouch
 Tommy Giles Rogers Jr. (born 1980), American musician

See also
Thomas Rogers (disambiguation)